Ortaklar is a village in Derecik District in Hakkâri Province in Turkey. The village is populated by Kurds of the Begzade and Gerdî tribes and had a population of 1,569 in 2021.

The two hamlets of Ormancık and Örencik are attached to it. Örencik is unpopulated.

It was attached to Şemdinli District before becoming part of the newly-created Derecik District in 2018.

Population 
Population history of the village from 2000 to 2022:

References 

Villages in Derecik District
Kurdish settlements in Hakkâri Province